Nite Tales: The Movie is a 2008 horror anthology film that includes two movies: Karma and Storm. It was written by Diana Erwin and Deon Taylor. The film is hosted by rapper Flavor Flav who is seen wearing his trademark large oversized necklace clock.

Plot

'Karma' follows a gang of bank robbers who get more than they bargained for when their car breaks down near a remote farmhouse, while 'Storm' follows a group of students whose night of partying takes a dark turn as they play a game of Bloody Mary.

Cast

Karma
Kirk "Sticky Fingaz" Jones as Dice
Michael J. Pagan as Muse
Fredro Starr as Twan
Tyrin Turner as Dee
Soraya Kelley as Sarah
Terrence Evans
Richard Moorhouse as Bank manager
James Otis

Storm
Dante Basco as Gerard
Jordan Woolley as Tom
Sandra McCoy as Serena
Andrea Bogart as Cindy
Chico Benymon as Mitch
James Ferris as Cop / The Police Officer
Tony Todd as Clown / James
Ariele Senara as Bloody Mary

Nite Tales: The Series
Nite Tales: The Series was created after Nite Tales: The Movie due to the success of its airing. Episodes were shot in one day on a 35 millimeter camera and budgeted around $20,000 – $50,000. The series was later aired on WGN in Chicago, Illinois on Friday nights at midnight in 2009. Nite Tales: The Movie was released on DVD in 2008 with a DVD release of the series pending in the future.

Cast
Flavor Flav as Himself – Host / Time Keeper
Ray Crockett as Host (episode "Ima Star")

Episodes

Season 1 (2009)

Season 2 (2011)

References

External links
 Deon Taylor Enterprises
 
 

Films directed by Deon Taylor
2008 horror films
2008 films
American horror anthology films
2000s English-language films
2000s American films